Northeast Ohio Community and Neighborhood Data for Organizing (NEO CANDO) is an online database built and managed by the Center on Urban Poverty and Community Development, under the direction of Co-director Claudia Coulton at the Mandel School of Applied Social Sciences in Cleveland, Ohio.  The database was started in 1988 as CANDO and now houses data for a 17-county region centering on the Greater Cleveland, and the Cuyahoga County area in Northeast Ohio. This data is varied in its completeness for geographies, but contains crime data for the City of Cleveland, food stamp and TANF usage counts, social indicators, economic indicators, and a restricted-use section for properties in the foreclosure, sheriff's sale and Real Estate Owned (REO) process. These data are used by neighborhood associations, Non-profit organizations, governmental agencies such as the Cuyahoga County Planning Commission, and Community Development Corporations such as Slavic Village Development, to plan activities, or to improve neighborhoods, or to propose social programing, and to combat the advance of urban decay accelerated by the 2010 United States foreclosure crisis.

Its use to combat the negative effects of the foreclosure crisis, has been noted and supported as a national model at conferences, such as the national  Reclaiming Vacant Properties Conference and in several reports, such as Forefront, a publication of the Federal Reserve Bank of Cleveland, and REO & Vacant Properties: Strategies for Neighborhood Stabilization which is a joint publication of the Federal Reserve Banks of Boston and Cleveland and the Board of Governors.  

The Center is a member of the National Neighborhood Indicators Partnership (NNIP), a nationwide partnership of 34 similar organizations, an initiative of the Urban Institute.  The mission of the partnership is to democratize social, economic, and other indicator data down to the neighborhoods level for use by local governments and other agencies operating locally.

The Center on Urban Poverty and Community Development (CUPCD) is based in a university context as part of the Mandel School of Applied Social Sciences at Case Western Reserve University. The Mandel School strongly emphasizes direct work with local citywide and community institutions to address the opportunities and problems of poor neighborhoods. The CUPCD mission is "to create, communicate, and apply knowledge of value to a broad range of audiences and constituents concerned with the ultimate goal of reducing urban poverty and its consequences. . . . The Center serves as a pathway between the university, and the community, linking social science to social change."

CUPCD Director Claudia Coulton began assembling neighborhood-level data soon after the Center was founded. In 1990, the Center issued a full report on trends in Cleveland's neighborhoods over the preceding two decades-a report used as the primary basis for the formation of the [ Arthur Naparstek | Cleveland Foundation Commission on Poverty] which was the foundation for "The Cleveland Community-Building Initiative" report (c.f. History of Cleveland). That study became the foundation for the U.S. Department of Housing and Urban Development's Urban Revitalization Demonstration Act of 1993, known as HOPE VI. As this and other reports were more widely disseminated, the Center began to receive more requests for data assistance. In response to this demand, the staff developed the original CAN DO system.

In its current form, NEO CANDO contains neighborhood-level information from the 1990 census and from a variety of administrative data files (information, for the most part, for every year since 1980). Administrative data series go back to 1979 and are now updated annually. System data are made available through a user-friendly, menu-driven, online database network. The data can be accessed via the Internet through the Center's website at http://neocando.case.edu. It can also be mapped and downloaded for a user's additional analysis. Community groups can thus access and use the database directly. Center staff provide training and technical assistance to help them use it effectively in planning and program development.

External links
NEO CANDO
The Center on Urban Poverty and Community Development
CUPCD Blog
National Neighborhood Indicators Project
The Urban Institute

Geographic region-oriented digital libraries
Case Western Reserve University
Online databases
Greater Cleveland